Nagorsky (masculine), Nagorskaya (feminine), or Nagorskoye (neuter) may refer to:
Nagorsky District, a district of Kirov Oblast, Russia
Nagorsky (rural locality) (Nagorskaya, Nagorskoye), name of several rural localities in Russia

See also
 
 Nagorski, a surname